William Still (1820 – 5 July 1910) was an Australian cricketer. He played two first-class matches for New South Wales between 1856/57 and 1858/59.

See also
 List of New South Wales representative cricketers

References

External links
 

1820 births
1910 deaths
Australian cricketers
New South Wales cricketers